= Peace II =

1946 painting by George Grosz

- Artist: George Grosz
- Year: 1946
- Medium: oil on canvas
- Dimensions: 118.7 cm × 84 cm (46.7 in × 33 in)
- Location: Whitney Museum of American Art; New York

Peace II is an oil-on-canvas painting by German American artist George Grosz, created in 1946. It is held at the Whitney Museum of American Art, in New York.

== Description ==
Grosz was living in the United States when World War II finished in 1945. He had lived in the US since 1933 and did not return to his native Germany until 1959, shortly before his death. Peace II was the second version that he did of a painting in which he envisioned Germany as it was after the end of the war. The painting has an apocalyptic atmosphere, being dominated by dark and reddish colours, which suggest a warlike scenario, with ongoing bombings or fires and destruction. The artist depicts himself as a grim figure at the center of the composition, emerging from the ruins of a building and surrounded by rubble, as if he were a survivor in a devastated world. The work can be interpreted as a mourning for his mother, who had died during the late conflict, and for the current state of Germany.
